Mount Victoria is a former New Zealand electorate, centred on the inner-city suburb of Mount Victoria in the southern suburbs of Wellington. It existed from 1946 to 1954, and was represented by one Member of Parliament, Jack Marshall.

Population centres
The 1941 New Zealand census had been postponed due to World War II, so the 1946 electoral redistribution had to take ten years of population growth and movements into account. The North Island gained a further two electorates from the South Island due to faster population growth. The abolition of the country quota through the Electoral Amendment Act, 1945 reduced the number and increased the size of rural electorates. None of the existing electorates remained unchanged, 27 electorates were abolished, eight former electorates were re-established, and 19 electorates were created for the first time, including Mount Victoria.

There was no adjustment in the number of electorates between the South and North Islands, but the law changes resulted in boundary adjustments to almost every electorate through the 1952 electoral redistribution; only five electorates were unaltered. Five electorates were reconstituted and one was newly created, and a corresponding six electorates were abolished (including Mount Victoria); all of these in the North Island.

History
After the war, Jack Marshall briefly established himself as a barrister, but was soon persuaded to stand as the National Party's candidate for the new Wellington electorate of Mount Victoria in the 1946 election. The electorate was marginal, but he won it by 911 votes. He was, however, nearly disqualified by a technicality – Marshall was employed at the time in a legal case for the government, something which ran afoul of rules barring politicians from giving business to their own firms. However, because Marshall had taken on the case before his election (and so could not have influenced the government's decision to give him employment), it was obvious that there had been no wrongdoing. As such, the Prime Minister, Peter Fraser of the Labour Party, amended the regulations.

Marshall held the electorate for the three terms of its existence.

Jack Marshall became Prime Minister in the Second National Government in 1972, after Keith Holyoake retired. He was defeated by Norman Kirk in the 1972 election, and was replaced as leader of the National Party by Robert Muldoon in 1974.

Members of Parliament
The Mount Victoria electorate was represented by one Member of Parliament.

Key

Election results

1951 election

1949 election

1946 election

Notes

References

Historical electorates of New Zealand
Politics of the Wellington Region
1946 establishments in New Zealand
1954 disestablishments in New Zealand